The Rancho Bernardo Handicap is a Grade III American Thoroughbred horse race for fillies and mares age three and older run over a distance of six and one half furlongs on the dirt held annually in August at Del Mar Racetrack in Del Mar, California. The event currently carries a purse of $150,000.

History

The event named after the master-planned community community Rancho Bernardo, San Diego located about 25 miles from Del Mar, was inaugurated on 14 October 1967 during the then Del Mar Fall meeting and held in split divisions for three-year-olds and older, and was run over a distance of one mile on the dirt track. The event was idle for five years and was resurrected in 1973 again in split divisions for three-year-olds and older, but this time on the grass track over  miles.
 
In 1974 the event was shortened to 6 furlongs and conditions were for fillies and mares three-years-old and older. 

In 1986 the distance for the event was increased to  furlongs which is the current distance.

In 1988 the event was classified as a Grade III race. 

In 1997 the John W. Sadler trained Track Gal won the event for the third time straight.

Between 1990 and 1995 the race had Breeders' Cup incentives which reflected in the name of the event. As of 2008, it is a Breeders' Cup "Win And You're In" event, qualifying the winner to run in the Breeders' Cup Filly & Mare Sprint. 
 
The event has showcased some brilliant female sprinters that have gone on to capture Breeders' Cup events. Of these mares, the 1995 winner Desert Stormer went onto win the Breeders' Cup Sprint at Belmont Park defeating males. The 2014 winner Judy the Beauty went on to win the Breeders' Cup Filly & Mare Sprint and was crowned US Champion Female Sprint Horse that year.

Records
Speed record: 
  furlongs: 1:14.20 - Track Gal (1995)  
 6 furlongs:  	1:08.60 - Impressive Style (1974), Great Lady M. (1980), Lucky Lady Ellen (1982), Pleasure Cay (1984) 

Margins:
 5 lengths - Track Gal (1996)

Most wins:
 3 - Track Gal (1995, 1996, 1997)

Most wins by a jockey:
 9 - Laffit Pincay, Jr. (1976, 1977, 1980, 1982, 1984, 1988, 1989, 1991, 2000)
 8 - Chris McCarron (1978, 1983, 1986, 1987, 1995, 1996, 1997, 1998)

Most wins by a trainer:
 7 - John W. Sadler (1995, 1996, 1997, 2008, 2018, 2021, 2022)

Most wins by an owner:
 3 - William H. Oldknow & Robert W. Phipps  (1995, 1996, 1997)
 3 - Hronis Racing (2018, 2021, 2022)

Winners

Legend:

See also
List of American and Canadian Graded races

External site
 2020 Del Mar Media Guide

References

Del Mar Racetrack
Horse races in California
Graded stakes races in the United States
Sprint category horse races for fillies and mares
1967 establishments in California
Recurring sporting events established in 1967
Grade 2 stakes races in the United States
Breeders' Cup Challenge series